Contemporary Women's Writing is a triannual academic journal, affiliated to the Contemporary Women's Writing Association, which critically assesses writing by women authors who have published from approximately 1970 to the present.

The journal is a published by Oxford University Press and its editors-in-chief are Suzanne Keen (Washington and Lee University) and Emma Parker (University of Leicester).

History 
The journal was established in 2007, with Mary Eagleton (Leeds Metropolitan University) and Susan Stanford Friedman (University of Wisconsin-Madison) as founding editors.

Awards 
In 2009, the journal won The Council of Editors of Learned Journals award for best new journal at the Modern Language Association's conference in Philadelphia.

Abstracting and indexing

References

External links 
 

Literary magazines published in the United Kingdom
Oxford University Press academic journals
Publications established in 2007
Triannual journals
Women's studies journals
English-language journals